Pavel Kastramin (born 12 July 1991) is a boxer from Belarus. He represented Belarus at the 2016 Summer Olympics in the men's welterweight, where he lost to Sailom Adi of Thailand in the first round by split decision.

References

External links
 
 
 
 

1991 births
Living people
Belarusian male boxers
Olympic boxers of Belarus
Boxers at the 2016 Summer Olympics
Welterweight boxers
21st-century Belarusian people